La Arrolladora Banda El Limón de René Camacho, or simply La Arrolladora, is a Mexican banda from Mazatlán, Sinaloa. In 1997 they signed with Sony Music Latin. In 2003, they switched labels and signed with Disa Records.

History
Banda El Limón was formed in 1965 in El Limón de los Peraza, Sinaloa by Pedro Aramburo, Encarnación Peraza, Lino Quintero, Carlos Peraza and Pedro Peraza. The Banda began performing in the port of Mazatlán, and in 1976, Salvador Lizárraga assumed the direction of the Banda.

In 1997, internal conflicts arose in the Banda, as René Camacho assumed the temporary direction while Salvador Lizárraga was recovering from a stroke. The disputes between Camacho and Lizárraga led to the division of the Banda in two: René Camacho recruited many members of the Banda and founded La Arrolladora Banda El Limón, while the members who remained with Lizárraga continued performing as La Original Banda El Limón. Since both bandas are very popular, often with the same crowd, René Camacho's banda is referred to simply as “La Arrolladora” to avoid confusion.

Discography

Studio albums
Sony Music Latin (After relaunched by La Sierra Records)
Se Me Cansó El Corazón (1997) (First album)
Corridos Arrolladores (1997)
Antes de Partir (1998)
Secretos de mi Memoria (1999)
Era cabron el viejo (2000)
simplemente...Arrolladora (2000)
Pa' Adoloridos (2001)
Valió la pena equivocarme (2001)
Grandes Boleros Arrolladores Homenaje a la Internacional Sonora Santanera (2002)
Mas allá de mí (2003) (Last album on Sony)
Disa Records
Grandes Boleros Arrolladores Homenaje a la Internacional Sonora Santanera (2002) (Reissue on Disa)
Se me acabó el amor (2003) (Reissue of "Más allá de mí")
Huele a Peligro (2004) (First album officially on Disa)
La otra cara de la moneda (2006)
Y que quede claro (2007)
Más Adelante (2009)
Todo depende de Tí (2010)
Irreversible...2012 (2012)
Gracias Por Creer (2013)
Ojos en Blanco (2015)
Libre Otra Vez (2016)
Calidad Y Cantidad (2018)

Live albums
En Vivo Desde Culiacán Sinaloa (2004)
Para Ti Exclusivo desde Arandas, Jalisco En Vivo (2007)
Sold Out Desde Los Angeles (2009)
En Vivo Desde el Coloso de Reforma (2014)

Compilations
Éxitos Arrolladores (2004)
Los Super Éxitos (2006)
Las Número 1 (2007)
Lo Esencial de la Arrolladora Banda el Limón (2009)
Corridos arrolladores 2 (2010)

Awards and nominations

Latin Grammy Awards

|-
|2011
|Todo Depende De Tí
|Best Banda Album
| 
|-

Lo Nuestro Awards

|-
|2011
|Todo Depende De Tí
|Best Banda Album
| 
|-
|rowspan="5" scope="row"| 2013
|scope="row"| La Arrolladora Banda El Limón de René Camacho
|scope="row"| Artist of the Year
| 
|-
|scope="row"| La Arrolladora Banda El Limón de René Camacho
|scope="row"| Regional Mexican Group
| 
|-
|scope="row"| La Arrolladora Banda El Limón de René Camacho
|scope="row"| Banda Artist of the Year
| 
|-
|scope="row"| Irreversible... 2012
|scope="row"| Regional Mexican Album
| 
|-
|scope="row"| "Llamada De Mi Ex"
|scope="row"| Regional Mexican Song
| 
|-
|rowspan="2" scope="row"| 2014
|scope="row"| La Arrolladora Banda El Limón de René Camacho
|scope="row"| Regional Mexican Group
| 
|-
|scope="row"| La Arrolladora Banda El Limón de René Camacho
|scope="row"| Banda Artist
| 
|-
|rowspan="2" scope="row"| 2015
|scope="row"| La Arrolladora Banda El Limón de René Camacho
|scope="row"| Banda Artist of the Year
| 
|-

Source:

References

La Arrolladora Banda El Limón at Billboard.com
https://web.archive.org/web/20080308125759/http://www.disa.com.mx/artista.cfm?id=115
La Arrolladora Banda El Limón (official)
http://www.voymusic.com/radio/artists-biography-366-la_arrolladora_banda_el_limon

External links
Universal Music Latin Entertainment | La Arrolladora Banda El Limón

Mexican musical groups
Banda music groups
Universal Music Latin Entertainment artists
Musical groups from Sinaloa